Marcus Maier (born 18 December 1995) is an Austrian footballer who plays for Floridsdorfer AC.

Club career
On 12 January 2022, Maier joined Floridsdorfer AC.

References

1995 births
Footballers from Vienna
Living people
Austrian footballers
Austria youth international footballers
Association football midfielders
FC Admira Wacker Mödling players
Floridsdorfer AC players
Austrian Regionalliga players
Austrian Football Bundesliga players
2. Liga (Austria) players